The Tidal Wave is a 1920 British silent drama film directed by Sinclair Hill and starring Poppy Wyndham, Sydney Seaward and Pardoe Woodman. It is based on a short story by Ethel M. Dell. A fisherman rescues an artist from the sea, and falls in love with her.

Cast
 Poppy Wyndham as Columbine  
 Sydney Seaward as Matt Brewster  
 Pardoe Woodman as Frank Knight 
 Annie Esmond as Aunt Liza 
 Judd Green as Adam Brewster

References

Bibliography
 Low, Rachael. History of the British Film, 1918-1929. George Allen & Unwin, 1971.

External links

1920 films
1920 romantic drama films
British romantic drama films
British silent feature films
Films directed by Sinclair Hill
British black-and-white films
Films based on works by Ethel M. Dell
Films based on short fiction
Stoll Pictures films
1920s English-language films
1920s British films
Silent romantic drama films